Orán Airport  is an airport serving Orán, a city in the agricultural valley of the Bermejo River in the Salta Province of Argentina. The airport is within the southern boundaries of the city.

The Oran non-directional beacon (Ident: ORA) is located on the field.

See also

Transport in Argentina
List of airports in Argentina

References

External links
OpenStreetMap - Orán Airport

Airports in Argentina